Guppy is a 2016 Indian Malayalam-language drama film written and directed by Johnpaul George. It stars Chethan Jayalal and Tovino Thomas in the lead roles, along with Sreenivasan, Rohini, Sudheer Karamana, Dileesh Pothan, and Alencier Ley Lopez in supporting roles. The film was released on 5 August 2016 to positive reviews, but had a moderate performance in the box office.

The film revolves around the unexpected rivalry that starts between a teenager, Guppy and the engineer who comes for the construction of the village dream project. Centered on the theme of hope.

Plot
Named after the angel, Michael (rather known as Guppy) is the sole support to his ailing mother. A talented artist, the teenager earns a living by rearing and selling the ornamental fish – Guppy. He takes great care of his disabled Mother and aspires to gift her a fully automatic wheelchair, someday. The little mischiefs that his friends get into and the occasional glimpses from the neighborhood teenage beauty, Amina, makes his day. Their small fishing village is, lately, under a lot of excitement. Their village dream project just got sanctioned – a railway over-bridge to bypass the railway gate en route. People await the engineers from Road and Bridges Development Corporation.

Meanwhile, somewhere in the Himalayas, a rider starts his journey leaving his dear ones and 'Malu', heading for the village. He arrives at the small roadside stall where the boy works, stopping for a tea. Like the others present, Guppy gets prejudiced with the unconcerned lifestyle of a rider, for the people here strive hard to subsist. Gaps in communication and probably with his biased views, he offend the individual with the tea given. The experience end on a bad note for the two, with both their egos getting hurt. Little did Guppy know that the rider was here to stay, for he was the Engineer Thejus Varkey in charge of building the over-bridge. A near miss accident the next day give Guppy his upper hand and the teen gang loot the engineer for damages, when there actually is none.

Days pass by and the rest of the team arrive. Works start with initial planning and sketching. The engineer befriend the local village officer and convince him to slash the price per pair for the guppy fish that the office pays to the boy. Being forced an apology, Guppy’s self-esteem urge him otherwise. The engineer find the boy near his office jeep with flat tires, waiting for him. Instincts send the boy running, while the engineer chase after him and slap him, driving the rest of his gang to attack in defence. With a stone Guppy smash that hand of the engineer that slapped him. Later Thejus find their tent vandalized – burnt to ashes, leading him to send back his team till he finish the unresolved task.

Thejus takes his time off, studying the canals and former civil undertakings. His secret plan takes shape. The illegal pisciculture of the boy in the blocked drainage, causing floods during rain, along with the roadside stall where he works are to be destroyed by the police as part of the expansion of roads for the bridge. Giving him no time to shift, the tank is mercilessly destroyed sending the fish down the drain. The engineer’s revenge is complete and the harm is done. From his meagre savings, Guppy hire an outlaw to hurt the man in return. The engineer is stabbed, from the front, horrifying the kid.

Guppy now know that things spiraled out of hand. The engineer’s silence to the police frighten him even more, for the revenge will be something worse. Left all alone, helplessly watching his dreams slipping away and awaiting his assured fate, all his pride and courage drain out. His fear does not go unnoticed by his mother, to whom he reveal nothing. Thejus on the other hand, lonely on the hospital bed, is in pain but not physically. He too await to regain strength, to meet the boy.

Amina, the girl fancied by the Guppy, lives with her grandparents as her parents are both dead. The grandfather (whom she calls Uppooppa) works as the temporary gate operator at the railway gate, hoping to make her an engineer one day. Once the over-bridge is commissioned he will lose his job and at his age, is unable to find another. His mannerisms always irritated the team and he couldn’t make friends with any. The solution to the poor man’s problem, thought out by his slender perspective, was to drive the team away. He was the one who punctured the tires of the office jeep and destroyed their tent. When nothing seemed to work, at the end of his pitiful rope, face covered, he stabbed the engineer. But now the thoughts scare him. He too is admitted in the hospital with chest pain and regrets his actions.

The engineer having seen the one who stabbed him, now realize that his very presence chocked the lives of two innocent souls and their dependents. The bridge on the other hand, is just a political stunt targeting the vote bank; with nothing fruitful coming out of it for the society. Stating the project as ‘technically unfeasible’, he stops the million-rupee project; delaying it for at least another ten years. He meets Uppooppa to say that he understands and he will help with Amina’s dreams; forgiving him for his insanity. Revealing the courage to correct his deeds, he rebuilt Guppy’s tank and gift it in grandiose; before leaving the place empty-handed. Guppy, relieved from his worries, run home to his mother with the happy news. Leaving him all alone, he finds her having breathed her last; while another gift, the long-awaited wheelchair is still on its way.

It has now been days since the boy left the village. The old man, Tinku as he is fondly called, come back after weeks of caring for an old lady who might have been his long-lost mother. He happened to have read about Thejus Varkey, who filled the news some years back. He was the engineer who constructed the much anticipated Omallur Bridge. On the day of the inauguration, his family met with an accident that killed his parents, his wife and his 7-year-old daughter, Malu. Riding was his way out of his grief. To him every child that he met was his daughter Malu, refusing to leave her with the dead. This railway over-bridge was likely the only work he undertook since.

Thejus is shown once again riding through the Himalayas with his dear Malu, never having been so relieved and content, with the happy child Michael in his care. Like an answer to the prayers of his mother, Michael will never be left alone and so will be Thejus.

Cast 

 Chethan Jayalal as Michael / Guppy
 Tovino Thomas as Engineer Thejus Varkey
 Sreenivasan as Upooppa
 Rohini as Guppy's mother
 Nandhana Varma as Aamina
 Vijilesh Karayad as Pappoy
 Karthik Vishnu as Christy
 Arun Paul as Abu
 Sarath Jayan as Jaffer
 Alencier Ley Lopez as Paappan
 Sudheer Karamana as Lalichan
 Dileesh Pothan as Krishnan, village officer
 Sudhi Koppa as Chink Divakar
 Pauly Valsan as Molly
 Noby as Oanachan
 K. L. Antony Kochi as Tinku
 Poojappura Ravi as Chinnappan 
 Devi Ajith as Aamina's  grandmother
 Anand Bal as Police Inspector

Production
The film is jointly produced by E4 Entertainment and A. V. A. Productions, in association with Yopa Cinemas.

Soundtrack 

The soundtrack features songs composed by Vishnu Vijay. The lyrics were penned by Vinayak Sasikumar, Rafeeq Ahamed and Johnpaul George. The background score was also produced by Vishnu Vijay and orchestrated by Sushin Shyam.

Release
Guppy was originally scheduled to release on 29 July 2016, but due to some procedural issue in getting the film censored, the release was postponed to and released on 5 August 2016.
The film was released in 72 theaters across Kerala.

Critical reception 
The film received positive reviews from critics.

Times of India gave a rating of 3/5 and mentioned that director and scriptwriter Johnpaul George deserves credit for weaving the beautiful tale

The Hindu mentioned that in Guppy director Johnpaul George is visibly eager to bring on screen everything he ever wanted to shoot and ends up packing in just a little too much.'

Malayala Manorama gave a rating of 3/5 and said that 'While it's a thumbs up for the maiden directorial venture, one is too tempted to sing 'beauty, beauty everywhere, but a good number of edits short of being a fine film'

Entertainment website Sify with its inherent honesty, debutant director Johnpaul George's Guppy is a good film that has its fine moments

The power of the screenplay in getting the audience involved, choosing between sides and later making them regret their choice is worthy of mention.

Awards

47th Kerala State Film Awards
The film won 5 awards for 2016 47th Kerala State Film Awards which was announced on 7 March 2017.

Best Child Artist - Chethan Jayalal
Best Background Music - Vishnu Vijay
Best Male Singer - Sooraj Santhosh
Best Costume Designer - Stephy Savier
Special Mention -	Girish Gangadharan

Home media
Guppy garnered excellent reviews after the DVD release which prompted lead actor Tovino Thomas asking through Facebook about re-releasing the movie in theaters again. The lead actor said that after the release of the DVD, he has been receiving a lot of messages from people who regret missing out on the movie in theaters.

See also
 Guppy

References

External links
 
Guppy Fish

2016 films
2010s Malayalam-language films